Postal codes in Guatemala are 5 digit numeric. The first two numbers identify the department, the third number the route/municipality and the last two the office.

External links
 El Correo de Guatemala

Guatemala
Communications in Guatemala